is a Japanese decathlete. He competed at the 2009 World Championships.

International competition

National titles
Japanese Championships
Decathlon: 2009

References

External links

Daisuke Ikeda at JAAF 

1986 births
Living people
Sportspeople from Tottori Prefecture
Japanese decathletes
World Athletics Championships athletes for Japan
Japan Championships in Athletics winners
Nihon University alumni